Recumbent may refer to:

 Recumbence, the act or state of lying down or leaning
 Recumbent bicycle, a bicycle, tricycle or quadricycle which places the rider in a reclined or supine position
 Recumbent effigy, a tomb sculpture of the deceased
 Recumbent stone circles, a variation on the more familiar standard stone circles found throughout the UK